Daniel Donald MacPherson (born 25 April 1980) is an Australian actor and television presenter, known for his roles as Joel Samuels in Neighbours, PC Cameron Tait in The Bill, Sergeant Samuel Wyatt in Sky and Cinemax's Strike Back,  Whit Carmichael in the Shane Abbess sci-fi film Infini, Arion Elessedil in The Shannara Chronicles and Hugo Crast in the first filmed adaptation of Isaac Asimov's long running Foundation book series, loosely adapted as Foundation. He also co-hosted Dancing with the Stars for six years while simultaneously starring in a number of Australian dramas such as Wild Boys.

Early life
MacPherson grew up in Sydney's beachside suburb of Cronulla. He was accepted into Mensa at the age of 10 and went on to attend the academically selective school Sydney Boys High School.

Career
MacPherson was discovered while competing in the Kurnell triathlon in southern Sydney when he was 16. He soon landed the role of Joel Samuels in the soap opera Neighbours, starting in 1998. Soon after, MacPherson won a Logie Award in 1999 for Most Popular New Talent. After leaving the soap in 2002, MacPherson travelled to the United Kingdom to star in a British production of the musical Godspell in which he alternated the lead roles of Jesus and Judas with English entertainer Jonathan Wilkes. During this time MacPherson resided in Notting Hill with close friend Robbie Williams. After completing the show, MacPherson was offered the role of PC Cameron Tait in the British drama The Bill, which he played from 2003 until late 2004. Upon leaving The Bill, he took a role playing Jesus opposite Edward Woodward as God in The Mysteries. This was a drama based on a medieval mystery play cycle in which every scene moved to a different part of Canterbury Cathedral.

In 2005, MacPherson returned to Australia to present the Australian version of The X Factor. MacPherson received very positive feedback, despite the series attracting low ratings. After the season had finished, reports stated that before one of the live shows MacPherson was accidentally knocked unconscious by a crew member. After regaining consciousness several minutes later, and being rushed to hospital, MacPherson went on to do the show that night despite being heavily concussed. He says he "remembers nothing at all" from that night's broadcast. This was undetected by the public. The following year, MacPherson hosted a three-part series called Killer Sharks on Australia's Network Ten in February 2006. In late 2006, he appeared in a British/Australian production entitled Tripping Over. The show appeared on Channel 5 in the United Kingdom and Network Ten in Australia. Tripping Over featured MacPherson's ex-Neighbours co-star Brooke Satchwell. Tripping Over received numerous positive reviews and the show was a hit with Australian critics; however due to funding issues it was not picked up for a second season.

In October 2007, MacPherson left Network Ten after taking a role on the Seven Network's City Homicide. The show became the number one Australian Drama between 2007 and 2008. MacPherson left City Homicide during the fourth season. On 3 August 2008, the Seven Network announced that MacPherson would be taking over the hosting role on Dancing with the Stars, after former host Daryl Somers resigned at the end of 2007. This was his first live hosting gig since The X Factor in 2005. On 17 May 2010, MacPherson guest co-hosted The Morning Show alongside Kylie Gillies, while regular male presenter Larry Emdur was on holidays. Macpherson hosted the Seven Network series, Beat the Star, a local version of the British and German television series for one season before the show was cancelled.

In 2011, MacPherson returned to hosting season 11 of Dancing with the Stars in the first half of the year, before filming a new "Australian Western" style show, called Wild Boys based around Bushrangers. MacPherson played the lead role and the show's protagonist, Jack Keenan and starred alongside Zoe Ventoura. Wild Boys premiered to strong ratings of 1.67 million viewers. This was not to last, and in November 2011, the Seven Network chose not to make a second season of the show. In 2013 MacPherson played the lead role of Whit in Shane Abbess's sci fi feature film Infini. Macpherson's performance in the lead role was universally praised for its intensity. MacPherson and Abbess re-united in 2015 for another science fiction film, SFV1, with MacPherson starring alongside US actor Kellan Lutz.  In February 2015, it was announced that MacPherson had landed the role of Arion in MTV's upcoming fantasy drama series The Shannara Chronicles. MacPherson appeared in a documentary special celebrating Neighbours 30th anniversary titled Neighbours 30th: The Stars Reunite, which aired in Australia and the UK in March 2015. In 2014, MacPherson resigned from Dancing with the Stars to focus on his film career; his replacement was comedian Shane Bourne.

In 2016, MacPherson was a fill-in co-host on The Project with Carrie Bickmore.

Other projects
MacPherson starred in the pantomime Jack and the Beanstalk in 1999 at the Victoria Theatre in Halifax. He also starred in two pantomimes at the Marlowe Theatre in Canterbury alongside Paul Hendy and Leila Birch, Cinderella in 2000 and Aladdin in 2001.

In 2006, MacPherson co-hosted the Sydney New Year's Eve 2006-07 telecast alongside Big Brother host Gretel Killeen. The telecast caused much controversy after former Big Brother 2004 housemates Ryan Fitzgerald and Bree Amer appeared to be drunk throughout their segments of the evening. Notably, MacPherson received much praise for being a "complete professional" and left with his reputation unscathed.

MacPherson competes in World Triathlon Corporation (WTC) and Ironman 70.3. He competed in Ironman Australia at Port Macquarie, where he missed out on qualifying for the Ironman World Championship in Hawaii by only one spot. His swim time of 49:30 in Ironman New Zealand 2008 was the fastest in his age group. His fastest Ironman remains 9-hour and 42 minutes in Port Macquarie in 2007.

In April 2009, MacPherson completed the China Ironman in Haikou. He completed the race in 11 hours and one minute, after a 3.8 km swim, 180 km bike ride and 42 km run in 45C heat. He came first in his 25–29 age group, qualifying him for the Hawaiian Ironman in October. MacPherson competed in the Hawaiian Ironman in 2009, finishing in 10 hours and 32 minutes. Macpherson has twice qualified for the Ironman 70.3 world championships, in 2013 and 2014.

Personal life
He began dating his Wild Boys co-star Zoe Ventoura in 2011. They became engaged in December 2014, and married on the Sunshine Coast, Queensland in November 2015. The couple have one child, a son born in December 2019 named Austin Xavier.
The pair announced their separation on social media in December 2020.

Filmography

Film

Television

Stage

Host

Awards and nominations

References

External links

 
 Daniel's Official Website

1980 births
Australian male musical theatre actors
Australian male television actors
Australian television presenters
Living people
Logie Award winners
Mensans
Male actors from Sydney